XXX: Exklusibong, Explosibong, Exposé (XXX: Exclusive, Explosive, Exposé) was a Philippine investigative news and crime show which premiered from March 4, 2006, to February 18, 2013, on ABS-CBN replacing Magandang Gabi... Bayan and it was replaced by Bistado. The show tackled anomalies and inconsistencies in the Philippines, criticizes the corruption in the Philippine society, from overpriced items to arms smuggling, covering a wide variety of topics that sometimes include Filipino traditions and beliefs. It was a public service show that aims to inform the people of the current problems troubling the Philippines.

The show was hosted by news anchors Julius Babao, Pinky Webb, and Anthony Taberna. Previously, Karen Davila, Henry Omaga-Diaz,  and Alex Santos hosted the show, with Babao being the only host to host every episode of the show.

Originally aired on Saturday evenings, the show moved its timeslots to late Monday nights on October 12, 2009, Monday replacing Kalye to give way to Pinoy Big Brother: Double Up. The show was officially ended due to picking up with Pinoy True Stories since December 3, 2012 and on February 25, 2013, Monday, Banana Nite took over its late night slot.

About
XXX was a public affairs program that exposes illegal activities from the government down to the streets of the Philippines.  XXX coordinates with local law enforcement agencies to help to justice people or entities that exploit individuals.  Through its team of accomplices with hidden cameras, XXX documents the details of certain schemes and modus operandi and uses it as evidence to hold any perpetrators responsible for their crimes.

2006–2008: Babao-Davila-Omaga-Diaz era
The show was Originally launched on March 4, 2006, and was Originally hosted by Julius Babao, Karen Davila and Henry Omaga-Diaz, and was aired on a Saturday primetime time slot.

2008–2009: Babao-Webb-Omaga-Diaz era
On May 3, 2008, Pinky Webb replaced Davila as host, who left the show to host Wonder Mom. The show slightly changed its opening billboard to reflect on Webb replacing Davila.

2009–2010: Babao-Webb-Santos era

On February 28, 2009, Alex Santos replaced Omaga-Diaz as host, and the opening theme/billboard, title card, graphics and filming set were changed.

On September 26 and October 3, XXX held two special episodes due to Typhoons Ondoy and Pepeng.

On October 12, 2009, following the premiere of Pinoy Big Brother: Double Up, XXX moved its timeslot from its Saturday primetime airing to a late night Monday airing after Bandila replacing Kalye.

2010–2013: Babao-Webb-Taberna era
On June 28, 2010, Anthony Taberna replaced Santos as host, and the opening billboard was slightly changed. The show aired its final episode on February 18, 2013, being replaced by Bistado, while Banana Nite took over its timeslot.

Hosts

Final
Julius Babao (2006–2013)
Pinky Webb (2008–2013)
Anthony Taberna (2010–2013)

Previous
Karen Davila (2006–2008)
Henry Omaga-Diaz (2006–2009)
Alex Santos (2009–2010)

On Studio 23 and ANC
XXX was aired on Studio 23 on Thursday 9:30 pm and also was aired on ABS-CBN News Channel every Saturday 2 pm as replay from Monday episode on ABS-CBN 2.

On DZMM TeleRadyo
XXX aired in DZMM TeleRadyo on September 5, 2011, at 9:15 PM. It was announced on August 30, 2011, in DZMM's Dos Por Dos. This was seen only in DZMM TeleRadyo.

See also
List of programs aired by ABS-CBN
ABS-CBN News and Current Affairs
Imbestigador

References

ABS-CBN News and Current Affairs shows
ABS-CBN original programming
Philippine reality television series
2006 Philippine television series debuts
2013 Philippine television series endings
Filipino-language television shows